The Bremerton Elks Temple Lodge No. 1181 Building overlooks the busy corner of Fifth Street and Pacific Avenue in downtown Bremerton, Washington. It was built in 1920 and renovated in 1947–48. It was listed on the National Register of Historic Places in 1995. It is now known as Catholic Charities' Max Hale Center.

It is a wood-frame building with a brick veneer on a concrete foundation, and has a sheet metal cornice. It was constructed in 1920 for the Bremerton Elks Lodge (BPOE 1181) with a Classical Revival design by architect Joseph Wohleb of Olympia. During 1947-48 it was enlarged and modified in the Moderne style, with design by Williams-Davis & Associates, a Bremerton architecture and engineering firm.

A grand exterior staircase once fronted the building. This was removed when the current white cube of first-floor space in front of the building was constructed in the 1940s. The white cube space, still existing, held a Payless Drug Store. 

In 2010, a center to serve at-risk youths was proposed as a use for the building, which was empty on at least its first floor. There was some community opposition to the proposed center, which was to be run by Catholic Community Services and Catholic Housing Services. 

What was eventually developed was 53 units of low-income permanent housing.

See also
 List of Elks buildings
 National Register of Historic Places listings in Kitsap County, Washington

References

External links

Elks buildings
Buildings and structures completed in 1920
Buildings and structures in Kitsap County, Washington
Clubhouses on the National Register of Historic Places in Washington (state)
Neoclassical architecture in Washington (state)
Bremerton, Washington
National Register of Historic Places in Kitsap County, Washington
1920 establishments in Washington (state)